Afzal Ansari (born 14 August 1953) is an Indian politician of the Bahujan Samaj Party and the Member of Parliament (MP) of India for Ghazipur constituency, Uttar Pradesh. He won the 2004 general Lok Sabha election on the Samajwadi Party ticket.

Early life
Afzal Ansari was born in Yusufpur–Mohammadabad town in Ghazipur district, Uttar Pradesh to Subhanullah Ansari and Begum Rabia. He received his school education. For higher studies, he enrolled in the local post-graduate college and completed Post Graduation from the University of Gorakhpur. He used to sell tickets at the Prince Cinema Hall, at Mohamedabad, Ghazipur, where his younger brother Mukhtar Ansari also used to sell black tickets.

Family
Afzal Ansari's father Subhanullah Ansari was the chairman of Nagar Palika Parishad, Mohammadabad, and was elected unopposed. His grandfather Mukhtar Ahmed Ansari served as the president (1926–1927) of the All-India Muslim League, as well as the Indian National Congress (INC), and was one of the founders of the Jamia Millia Islamia, New Delhi. Former Vice President of India Mohammad Hamid Ansari is Afzal Ansari's cousin. 

Afzal Ansari is married to Farhat Ansari since 26 October 1991 and the couple have 3 daughters.

Ansari's elder brother Sibgatullah Ansari and his younger brother Mukhtar Ansari both are politician and ex-MLA.

Political career

Member of Legislative Assembly
Ansari started his political career with the Communist Party of India. He contested Uttar Pradesh Legislative Assembly election in 1985 for the first time and defeated Abhay Narayan Rai from Indian National Congress with a margin of 3,064 votes. From 1985 to 2002, Ansari served five terms as Member of the Legislative Assembly for Mohammadabad Assembly constituency.

Member of Parliament
Afzal Ansari contested the 2004 Lok Sabha general election in 2004 on the Samajwadi Party ticket and defeated Manoj Sinha of the  Bharatiya Janata Party with a margin of 226,777 votes. He contested the 2009 general election on the Bahujan Samaj Party (BSP) ticket for Ghazipur but lost to the Samajwadi Party's Radhe Mohan Singh.

After some political differences, Ansari left the Bahujan Samaj Party and founded a new political party called Quami Ekta Dal and served as its  Secretary-General before merging it with Bahujan Samaj Party. Ansari rejoined the BSP in 2019 and contested the general election in Gazipur; he won the seat, becoming the 17th Lok Sabha member from Ghazipur.

Positions held
Afzal Ansari has been elected 5 times as MLA and 2 times as Lok Sabha MP.

References

External links
 Official biographical sketch in Parliament of India website

1953 births
Living people
People from Ghazipur
India MPs 2004–2009
Samajwadi Party politicians
Lok Sabha members from Uttar Pradesh
Communist Party of India politicians from Uttar Pradesh
Bahujan Samaj Party politicians from Uttar Pradesh
Quami Ekta Dal politicians
Uttar Pradesh MLAs 1985–1989
India MPs 2019–present